Keandre Jones (born September 24, 1997) is an American football linebacker for the Cincinnati Bengals of the National Football League (NFL). After playing college football at Ohio State and Maryland, he signed with the Chicago Bears as an undrafted free agent in 2020.

Professional career

Chicago Bears
Jones signed with the Chicago Bears as an undrafted free agent following the 2020 NFL Draft on April 28, 2020. He was waived on September 3, 2020.

Cincinnati Bengals
Jones signed with the Cincinnati Bengals' practice squad on September 8, 2020. He was elevated to the active roster on December 26 and January 2, 2021, for the team's weeks 16 and 17 games against the Houston Texans and Baltimore Ravens, and reverted to the practice squad after each game. He signed a reserve/future contract with the Bengals following the season on January 4, 2021.

On August 31, 2021, Jones was waived by the Bengals and re-signed to the practice squad the next day. He was promoted to the active roster on December 21.

On August 30, 2022, Jones was waived by the Bengals and signed to the practice squad the next day. He signed a reserve/future contract on January 31, 2023.

References

External links
Cincinnati Bengals bio
Maryland Terrapins football bio

1997 births
Living people
People from Olney, Maryland
Players of American football from Maryland
American football linebackers
Ohio State Buckeyes football players
Maryland Terrapins football players
Chicago Bears players
Cincinnati Bengals players